The Australian Space Board was a board that made up part of the Australian National Space Program initiative from 1986 until it was superseded by the Australian Space Council in 1994.

The board's role was to advise the Minister for Industry, Technology and Commerce on the National Space Program.

The board was made up of five members appointed by the minister, with the Australian Space Office being an ex-officio member. Later the CSIRO Office of Space Science and Applications also became a member.

See also

 National Space Program

References 

Space agencies
Space programme of Australia
1986 establishments in Australia
Government agencies established in 1986
Defunct Commonwealth Government agencies of Australia
1994 disestablishments in Australia